Shahrak Rural District is in Mamqan District of Azarshahr County, East Azerbaijan province, Iran. At the censuses of 2006 and 2011, the population was below the reporting threshold. At the most recent census of 2016, the population of the rural district was zero. Its only village was Tiramin.

References 

Azarshahr County

Rural Districts of East Azerbaijan Province

Populated places in East Azerbaijan Province

Populated places in Azarshahr County